Gutulia National Park is the smallest national park in Norway.  The landscape consists of lakes and virginal forests, dominated by spruce, pine and birch.  Because of the climate, growth is slow, and many of the spruce trees are hundreds of years old.  There is only one marked path through the park.

Gutulia lies close to Femundsmarka National Park and protected areas on the Swedish side of the border.

The name
The first element is the rivername Gutua, the last element is the finite form of li f 'hillside'. The name of the river is derived from gate f 'road' (frozen rivers were used as roads in wintertime).

External links
 Official webpage - Gutulia National Park

National parks of Norway
Protected areas established in 1968
Protected areas of Hedmark
Tourist attractions in Hedmark
1968 establishments in Norway
Engerdal